The Shuihudi Qin bamboo texts are early Chinese texts written on bamboo slips, and are also sometimes called the Yúnmèng Qin bamboo texts. They were excavated in December 1975 from Tomb #11 at Shuìhǔdì in Yunmeng County, Hubei, China. The tomb belonged to a Qin administrator of c. 217 BCE.

Written in the Qin dynasty, the texts record Qin laws and public documents. Their contents have been published in the book 《睡虎地秦墓竹簡》 (Shuìhǔdì Qínmù Zhújiǎn). This cache of bamboo slips is of great importance for research into the government, economics, culture, law, military affairs, etc. of the late Warring States to the Qin period.

While the Shuihudi cache is deemed to be among the most valuable epigraphic sources on the Qin history, the discoveries of the Qin Slips of Liye in 2002 and 2005 are regarded as being of equal, if not bigger, importance.

See also
 Guodian Chu Slips
 Shuanggudui
 Yinqueshan Han Slips
 Zhangjiashan Han bamboo texts
 Gao Heng (legal scholar)

Bibliography
Hulsewé, A.F.P. Remnants of Ch'in Law: An Annotated Translation of the Ch'in Legal and Administrative Rules of the 3rd Century BC. (Sinica Leidensia, No 17) Leiden: Brill, 1985.

References

Archaeological artifacts of China
Bamboo and wooden slips
History of Hubei
Qin dynasty culture
1975 archaeological discoveries
Legal history of China